Image of the Beast  (1968) is a horror erotic novel by American writer Philip José Farmer.

Background
The story follows Herald Childe, a private detective, who is sent a snuff film of his partner being murdered by what appears to be a vampire. His investigation into the identity of the killers leads him into a world of apparent monsters who have a predilection for brutal and supernatural sex. The monsters include vampires, werewolves, snake-women, and other undefined shape-changers.

The first printing or first edition of Image of the Beast was written for sf-porn publisher Essex House. It was a paperback selling at $1.95.

The sequel to this novel is Blown.

Image of the Beast was adapted by artist Tim Boxell (under the pseudonym "Grisly") as a comic book published by Last Gasp in 1973, with a second printing in 1979.

References 

1968 American novels
American erotic novels
American horror novels
American science fiction novels
Novels by Philip José Farmer
Science fiction erotica
American vampire novels
Fiction about snuff films